This is a list of vector spaces in abstract mathematics, by Wikipedia page.

Banach space
Besov space
Bochner space
Dual space
Euclidean space
Fock space
Fréchet space
Hardy space
Hilbert space
Hölder space
LF-space
Lp space
Minkowski space
Montel space
Morrey–Campanato space
Orlicz space
Riesz space
Schwartz space
Sobolev space
Tsirelson space

Linear algebra
Mathematics-related lists